Oka Raju Oka Rani is a 2003 Indian Telugu-language romantic comedy film directed by newcomer Yogi. The film features Ravi Teja and Namitha in the lead roles. Music has been composed by Chakri. The movie released on 19 June 2003.

Cast

Production 
Director Sobhan debuted as an actor with this film.

Soundtrack
The soundtrack is composed by Chakri and lyrics are written by director Trivikram Srinivas. The Hindu said that "The album, Oka Raju Oka Rani, certainly deserves more than just one hearing".

Release  
Idlebrain gave the film a rating of three out of five and said that "The film is good in the first half of the second half. However, the climax scene of Ravi Teja convincing Tanikella Bharani about their love is unconvincing". Gudipoodi Srihari of The Hindu opined that "Raviteja has a couple of handicaps — his hastiness in diction, sans improvement over these three or four successful films, and a typical style of domination over the fairer sex, keeping himself in a commanding position. Hence, the film lacks in aesthetics essential for a love story". Full Hyderabad wrote that "In a nutshell, Oka Raju... is like cold pizza - can be better, but is good anyway".

References

External links 

2003 films
2000s Telugu-language films
Films scored by Chakri